Päri may refer to:

Päri language (also known as Lokoro language), language spoken in South Sudan
Päri, Lääne County, village in Lääne-Nigula Parish, Lääne County, Estonia
Päri, Viljandi County, village in Viljandi Parish, Viljandi County, Estonia

See also
Pari (disambiguation)
Pari, Estonia, village in Võru Parish, Võru County, Estonia